Quammenis spectabilis is a species of beetle in the family Carabidae, the only species in the genus Quammenis.

References

Lebiinae
Taxa named by Terry Erwin